Andersson's Kalle (Swedish: Anderssonskans Kalle) is a 1972 Swedish comedy film directed by Arne Stivell and starring Sickan Carlsson, Sten-Åke Cederhök and Britta Holmberg. It is based on the 1901 novel of the same title by Emil Norlander, which has been adapted into films on several occasions. It was followed by a sequel Andersson's Kalle on Top Form in 1973.

Cast
 Tord Tjädersten as 	Kalle
 Sickan Carlsson as 	Anderssonskan
 Sten-Åke Cederhök as 	Jonsson
 Britta Holmberg as 	Pilgrenskan
 Chris Wahlström as 	Bobergskan
 Meta Velander as 	Camp Instructor
 Gunnel Wadner as 	Lövdahlskan
 Laila Westersund as 	Camp Maid
 Christer Lindgren as 	Berra
 Gus Dahlström as 	Möller
 Jan Olof Danielsson as 	Stubben
 Per-Axel Arosenius as	Captain
 Kar de Mumma as 	Teacher
 Rolf Demander as 	Greengrocer's clerk
 John Harryson as Circus Manager
 Stig Johanson as Greengrocer
 Gösta Krantz as 	Steinhardt
 Lars Lennartsson as Berner
 Agneta Lindén as 	Makjen
 Börje Nyberg as 	Johansson
 Bo Persson as 	Policeman
 Peter Ridder as 	Gustaf
 Stellan Skantz as	Teacher
 Magnus Tigerholm as 	Man
 Göran Wedsberg as 	Nerd

References

Bibliography 
 Qvist, Per Olov & von Bagh, Peter. Guide to the Cinema of Sweden and Finland. Greenwood Publishing Group, 2000.

External links 
 

1972 films
Swedish comedy films
1972 comedy films
1970s Swedish-language films
Films directed by Arne Stivell
Films based on Swedish novels
Remakes of Swedish films
Films set in Stockholm
1970s Swedish films